A poppy is any flower in the plant family Papaveraceae which has the common name poppy.

Poppy may also refer to:

People 
 Poppy (given name), including a list of people and fictional characters
 Poppy (nickname), a list of people
 Poppy (singer) (born 1995), American singer and YouTube personality
 Andrew Poppy (born 1954), English composer, pianist and record producer
 Karabo Poppy (born 1992), South African illustrator
 Poppy Z. Brite (born 1967), American author
 Poppy Montgomery (born 1972), Australian-American actress
 Poppy Harlow (born 1982), American journalist
 Poppy Morgan (born 1983), English pornographic actress
 Poppy Windham, stage name of British actress, interior decorator and pioneering aviator Elsie Mackay (c. 1893–1928)

Places
 Poppy Mountain, Massachusetts
 Poppy Peak, California (see Poppy Peak Historic District)

Arts and entertainment
 Poppy (1917 film), an American film starring Norma Talmadge
 Poppy (1923 musical), a Broadway comedy starring W. C. Fields
 Poppy (1936 film), based on the 1923 musical and again starring W. C. Fields
 Poppy (1952 film), an Italian comedy film starring Walter Chiari
 "Poppy", a song from the album Desperate Youth, Blood Thirsty Babes by TV on the Radio
 "Poppy", a song from K.I.D.S.
 "Poppy", a 2022 song by STAYC
 Poppy (1982 musical), a comedy about the Opium Wars
 Poppy (novel), a children's novel
 "Poppy" (The Brak Show), a 2002 episode

Vessels
 HMS Poppy, two 20th century Royal Navy ships
 USAHS Blanche F. Sigman, a 1943 World War II US Army hospital ship originally assigned the name USAHS Poppy
 USS Poppy (1863), an American Civil War steamboat

Other uses
 Poppy (publisher), a publisher of children's books
 Poppy (satellite), a 1971 series of US intelligence satellites
 Dedalus Poppy, a homebuilt 1980s ultralight aircraft

See also

 Remembrance poppy, a symbol worn mostly in countries of the British Commonwealth to commemorate veterans killed in war
 Poppi, a comune in Italy
 Poppie, a fictional character in the Seinfeld television series
 The Poppies (disambiguation), various musical groups and sports team nicknames